Curtis Lloyd Morrison (born 2 October 1997) is an English footballer who plays as a midfielder for Nantwich Town.

Club career
Morrison began his career with Chesterfield and made his professional debut in a 3–1 EFL Cup defeat against Rochdale.

On 31 August 2016, Morrison joined Gainsborough Trinity on a youth loan. On 30 September 2016 Morrison joined Matlock Town on a youth loan. On 20 January 2017, he rejoined Matlock Town on another youth loan, which was extended to a season-long loan on 22 March 2017. He left Guiseley in May 2019.

In June 2019, he joined Hednesford Town.

On 21 July 2021, Morrison re-joined Gainsborough for a third time.

On 11 February 2022, Morrison joined Northern Premier League Division One East side Cleethorpes Town on a free transfer.

On 24 March 2022, Morrison was one of four players to sign for Northern Premier League Division One East side Ossett United.

In September 2022, Morrison signed for Nantwich Town from league rivals Hyde United.

Career statistics

References

External links

1997 births
Living people
English footballers
Chesterfield F.C. players
Association football midfielders
Gainsborough Trinity F.C. players
Matlock Town F.C. players
Guiseley A.F.C. players
Buxton F.C. players
Hednesford Town F.C. players
Banbury United F.C. players
Cleethorpes Town F.C. players
Ossett United F.C. players
Hyde United F.C. players
Nantwich Town F.C. players
Northern Premier League players
English Football League players
National League (English football) players